Dwellers is an American found footage horror film written by, directed by, and starring Drew Fortier. The plot of the film follows a documentary crew who eventually go missing while uncovering the truths behind the disappearances within a homeless community. The film stars Drew Fortier, James L. Edwards, and Douglas Esper as themselves.

Cast 

 Drew Fortier as Drew
 James L. Edwards as James
 Douglas Esper as Doug
Omar Baig as Dotani
 Rick Jermain as Detective Jenkins
Dustin Boltjes
 Mitch Lafon as Mitch Lafon
 Jeffrey Hatrix as Serious Hobo
Tharasa DiMeo as Sewer Hobo
 David Ellefson as Ellefson
Isabelle Fox as Mr. Hands

Production 
Production was held over five non-consecutive days in the summer of 2019 with a budget of zero dollars. Included locations are: Barberton and Cleveland, Ohio, Chicago, Indianapolis, and Nashville.

In August 2019, the poster and teaser trailer were released for the film which includes a voiceover by Mitch Lafon from Rock Talk with Mitch Lafon as well as the Nine Inch Nails song "The Day the World Went Away" covered by Indie rock band The Foxery.

In November 2019, the full trailer for the film was released which features a cover of the Nine Inch Nails track "We're in This Together" performed by Ajna Cova .

According to a Q&A panel held at Rue Morgue's Frightmare in the Falls convention, David Ellefson and Drew Fortier explained that the film will be a gritty cinéma vérité experience with the story being told through the documentary being filmed as well as the behind the scene footage that the Drew character insists on being shot. Dwellers is described by Fortier as being heavily influenced by the films The Blair Witch Project and C.H.U.D..

Premiere 
In February 2021, Dwellers had its world premiere at the Mad Monster Party horror convention in Concord, North Carolina. The film's producer David Ellefson along with writer, director, and star Drew Fortier were in attendance for the event where they were presented with the Best Horror Feature award from the event's film festival.

Reception
Dwellers has received positive reviews amongst horror film critics including JoBlo.com who concluded that, "Drew Fortier's passion for the genre is ever-present, and I'll raise a drink to that type of love as it was integral to my youth as well. It's clear that Dwellers is a labor of love and working within some stringent limitations makes me appreciate the end result more. Drew, Doug, and James have good chemistry, with a few funny moments giving me the notion that these guys are friends in real life. With a sh*t load of cameos, It may be safe to say this is the heavy metal edition of The Blair Witch Project."

In April 2022, Dread Central included Dwellers on their 4 Subterranean Features To Pair With 'C.H.U.D.''' list which describes the film as "It’s a better sequel to C.H.U.D. than the one we got, which, granted, isn’t a high bar. But I digress. There’s a good bit of heart and fun throughout the film, which you know always resonates with me."

Awards

 Release Dwellers'' was released on Blu-Ray and Digital on October 12, 2021.

References

External links 
 
Official Website

2021 films
Found footage films
American mockumentary films
American psychological horror films
American monster movies
Films about film directors and producers
Films about homelessness
American independent films
Camcorder films
Films about missing people
2020s English-language films
2020s American films